Bath Hills is a   Local Nature Reserve west of Ditchingham in Norfolk. It is owned by South Norfolk District Council and managed by the Broads Authority.

This is the sheltered south side of a steep valley, and spring flowers bloom very early as a result.

References

Local Nature Reserves in Norfolk